Ayetoro lies on the latitude 70 12’N  and longitude 30 3’ E in a deciduous- derived savannah zone of Ogun State. The climate is sub-humid tropical with a longtime average annual rainfall of 1,909.30mm.  Ayetoro is about 35 km northwest of Abeokuta, a town in south-west part of Nigeria and the capital of Ogun State. The town is the administrative seat/headquarters of Yewa (formally known as Egbado) North Local Government Area. It is connected to Lagos by road and rail and serves as the shipping centre for an area in which cocoa, cassava, cowpea and maize are produced.

It is located in the Derived savanna agro ecological zone. Ayetoro lies between 90 and 120-m above sea-level. The entire area is made up of an undulating surface drained mainly by Rori and Ayinbo rivers. The landform is that of eroded pediment plain with wells incised valleys forming a trellis pattern. The soils are developed over a deeply weathered layer of sedimentary rocks consisting of false bedded sandstones which underlies the area.  The sediments are of lower cretaceous rocks or Abeokuta formation (Smyth and Montgomery, 1962) which spread monotonously in northwest and southwest directions. The soil is a gravelly Ultisol (Moormann et al., 1975).The major occupation of the majority of the people living in the town is farming.

The town is known for accommodating one of the oldest public high school - Comprehensive High School which is the pioneer of the current 6-3-4-4 system of education in the country. College of Agricultural Sciences - One of the colleges in Olabisi Onabanjo University was relocated from Ago-Iwoye to Ayetoro in December 2004 by the Gbenga Daniel led administration https://oouagoiwoye.edu.ng/yewa-campus-location-ayetoro/ retrieved 13 July 2021.

Notable people 
 Prince Gbadebo Omidokun - Egbado North Local Government Chairman (1985-1989), Chairman Ogun State Local Government Service Commission (1990-1992)
 Deacon Adepoju Adeyemi - Secretary to the State Government (1993, 1999–2003)
Rt. Hon. Adekumbi Suraju Ishola - Speaker, Ogun State House of Assembly (2011–2019).

Dr Iziaq Adekunle Salako, Ogun State Commissioner for Agriculture (2007-2008), Commissioner for Housing (2008-2009), Commissioner for Health (2009-2011). Chairman, Ogun State Hospitals Management Board, Secretary, Board of Trustees, Ayetoro Yewa Central Initiative for Development.

References 

 https://www.britannica.com/topic/Aiyetoro Aiyetoro

Towns in Yorubaland